61 athletes (49 men and 12 women) from Poland competed at the 1996 Summer Paralympics in Atlanta, United States.

Medallists

See also
Poland at the Paralympics
Poland at the 1996 Summer Olympics

References 

Nations at the 1996 Summer Paralympics
1996
Summer Paralympics